Walker Township is one of thirteen townships in Jasper County, Indiana, United States. As of the 2010 census, its population was 3,663 and it contained 1,356 housing units.

Walker Township was established in 1851.

Geography

Unincorporated towns
 Asphaltum
 Kniman
 Laura

Politics
-As of October 2, 2020

Township Trustee:
Ryan Myers (Republican)
Township Board Members: 
Brian Hanewich (Democratic)
Stan Ketchum (Democratic)
David B Whitaker (Democratic)

Adjacent townships
 Kankakee Township (northeast)
 Railroad Township, Starke County (northeast)
 Cass Township, Pulaski County (east)
 Gillam Township (southeast)
 Barkley Township (south)
 Keener Township (west)
 Union Township (west)
 Wheatfield Township (northwest)

Cemeteries
The township contains three cemeteries: Hershman, Kniman and Lutheran.

Major highways
  U.S. Route 231
  Indiana State Road 49
  Indiana State Road 110

Education
Walker Township residents are eligible to obtain a free library card from the Jasper County Public Library.

References
 U.S. Board on Geographic Names (GNIS)
 United States Census Bureau cartographic boundary files

External links
 Indiana Township Association
 United Township Association of Indiana

Townships in Jasper County, Indiana
Townships in Indiana